Osthathios Pathros (12 November 1963 – 20 August 2022) was an Indian Syriac Orthodox bishop, and Metropolitan of Bangalore Diocese.

 He belonged to the Pulikottil family of Kunnamkulam. He took the initiative in the formation of Coimbatore Christian Ecumenical Fellowship.

Education
Osthathios Pathros had a Bachelor of Arts degree in English Literature from the Madras University. He has also studied at the Malankara Syrian Orthodox Theological Seminary in Mulanthuruthy for a diploma in Theological Studies and joined the Calcutta Bishop's College for Bachelor of Divinity from the Serampore University. He also had a Master of Theology degree from Dharmaram Vidya Kshetram in Bangalore.

Death 
He died on 20 August 2022, at the age of 58.

References

1963 births
2022 deaths
Indian Oriental Orthodox Christians
People from Thrissur district
Syriac Orthodox Church bishops
University of Madras alumni